Albert Sissons (5 July 1903 – after 1927) was an English footballer who played for Doncaster Rovers and Leeds United.

References

1903 births
1975 deaths
People from Kiveton Park
English footballers
Association football forwards
Kiveton Park F.C. players
Doncaster Rovers F.C. players
Leeds United F.C. players
English Football League players